In Roads is the seventh studio album by Australian musician Jon English. The album was released in Australia in 1981.
Three singles were released from the album, including "Josephine (Too Many Secrets)" which peaked at number 9 in Norway.

Track listing
Vinyl/cassette (6357 067):

Side One
 "Been in Love Before" (Jon English) - 4:10
 "Blame It on the Night" (Dennis La Rue, Rick Blakemore) - 3:19
 "Straight from the Heart" (Bryan Adams) - 2:58
 "You Might Need Somebody" (Nan O'Byrne, Tom Snow) - 3:35
 "The Shining" (Greg Henson, English) - 4:14

Side Two
 "Touch and Go" (English) - 3:26
 "Stranger in a Strange Land" (La Rue, R. Blakemore) - 3:41
 "Move Better in the Night"	(Chris Thompson, Robbie McIntosh, Stevie Lange) - 4:49
 "Hope It Turns Out Right" (Mike Wade, Graeme Connors) - 3:54
 "Last Night in Hollywood" (Wade, Connors) - 3:54
 "Josephine (Too Many Secrets)" (Tim Friese-Greene, English) - 3:58

Weekly charts

References

External links

1981 albums
Jon English albums
Mercury Records albums